Sinners and Saints is the third release by New York-based punk/glam rock band Toilet Böys.

Track listing
  PHLY 2000   (2:04)
  Special   (2:57)
  Blue Halo   (3:31)
  Do or Die   (3:17)
  Influence   (2:59)
  Ride   (3:00)
  Untitled   (:24)
  Untitled   (:25)
  Fairies Wear Boots  (Black Sabbath cover)  (5:41)

References

Toilet Böys albums
1999 EPs